The Farmfoods European Senior Masters is a men's professional golf tournament for players aged 50 and above which is part of the European Senior Tour. It was first held in October 2017 at the Forest of Arden Hotel and Country Club, Meriden near Birmingham.

Winners

External links
Coverage on the European Senior Tour's official site

European Senior Tour events
Golf tournaments in England
Recurring sporting events established in 2017